Château de Hagueneck is a ruined castle in the commune of Wettolsheim, in the department of Haut-Rhin, Alsace, France. It is a listed historical monument since 1923.

References

Ruined castles in Haut-Rhin
Monuments historiques of Haut-Rhin